Melese lateritius is a moth of the family Erebidae. It was described by Heinrich Benno Möschler in 1878. It is found in Suriname and French Guiana.

References

External links
 Photo as M. niger.

Melese
Moths described in 1878